Kaptol can refer to:

 Kaptol, Zagreb, a part of Zagreb, Croatia
 Kaptol, Požega-Slavonia County, a municipality in Požega-Slavonia County, Croatia
 Kaptol, Kostel, a settlement in the Municipality of Kostel, Slovenia